The Grand Riviera Suites is a high rise residential skyscraper located along Roxas Boulevard in Manila, Philippines.

The building constructed by developer, Moldex Realty was designed by architectural firm, Asya Design Partner. Proposed in 2010 the building was constructed a year after and was completed in 2014. By June 2013, the building was already topped-off.

References

Skyscrapers in Manila
Residential buildings completed in 2014
Residential skyscrapers in Metro Manila
Buildings and structures in Ermita